The American Security Council Foundation (ASCF) is a non-profit organization founded by John M. Fisher that seeks to influence United States foreign policy by "Promoting Peace Through Strength". ASCF's current president is Dr. Henry A. Fischer. The ASCF was formed in 1958, and was originally known as the Institute for American Strategy. For over 50 years the Foundation has been focused on a wide range of educational programs which address critical challenges to U.S. foreign policy, national security, economic security and moral leadership of the United States of America. The ASCF headquarters is at 1250 24th Street NW, Suite 300.

On June 4, 1997, the American Security Council, a separate organization initiated in September 1954 by Robert E. Wood, retired chairman of Sears Roebuck and Company, was merged into the American Security Council Foundation.

History 
The ASCF has received credit for developing programs and strategies that have been adopted as the foreign policy and national security strategy of the United States.

This mission was mentioned in the Guidelines for Cold War Victory, a 1963 publication of the ASCF, and was additionally praised by former President Dwight Eisenhower in his radio address to the nation that was recorded at the ASCF's request.

In 1978, the ASCF created the National Strategy for Peace Through Strength and the Peace Through Strength Coalition.

President Ronald Reagan credited the ASCF numerous times for providing the overall theme for the administration of his presidency. Former President Reagan acknowledged the ASCF on multiple occasions and claimed America won the Cold War by adhering to this doctrine. President Reagan remarked that, "One thing is certain. If we're to continue to advance world peace and human freedom, America must remain strong. If we have learned anything these last eight years, it's that peace through strength works". Paul Laxalt, Chairman of the Reagan for President Campaign and Senate Co-Chairman of the CPTS, wrote to John Fisher that, "The Coalition's resolution calling for a national strategy for Peace through Strength became the defense strategy plank of the Republican Party Platform". President Reagan said, "I am particularly pleased that you also plan to involve members of congress, key administration officials and a wide range of private institutions in the further development of a national strategy of Peace Through Strength. This will be essential as a guide on how to spread democracy throughout the world. My administration will cooperate fully with you in this project". While George H. W. Bush was vice president, President Reagan and John Fisher jointly presented Vice President Bush with the Gold Presidents Eagle Pin in recognition of strong support of the Peace Through Strength strategy.

The ASCF worked to have the United States government publish an official National Security Strategy. This was first implemented by President Reagan in 1985. All of his successors are legally required to produce a similar document that analyzes the security priorities and concerns of the nation.

ASCF initiated and led the bi-partisan, “Coalition for Peace through Strength,” of which President Reagan was an active member. He adopted this winning policy, which, along with the Coalition’s influence on Congress, helped end the cold war and the demise of the Soviet Union.

The ASCF and the Coalition for Peace through Strength went on to advocate successfully for energy independence with the support of Congress.

In 2022 The ASCF launched the "American History Live" program which educates students on US History and Civics. As well as the "Guts and Grit Podcast".

Board Members 
 Dr. Henry A. Fischer (President & CEO)
 Ms. Joy Votrobek (Director of Operations)
 Dr. Joseph Crawford (Chairman of the Board)
 Mrs. Betsy Fischer (Secretary)
 Mr. Charles Cramer 
 Mrs. Joan Johnson
 Mrs. Karen Hiltz, Ed.D
 Mr. Wayne Tizzolo
 Honorable George Maxwell

Senior Advisory Board 
 Mr. Bud Johnson

Emeritus Board Members
 Mr. John M. Fisher (Founder)
 Admiral Thomas H. Moorer (Chairman Emeritus/In Memoriam)
 RADM Robert H. Spiro (Chairman Emeritus/In Memoriam)
 General Frederick J. Kroesen (First Vice President)
 Mr. Robert D. Johnson

References

External links
Drolet & Williams, "The radical Right, realism, and the politics of conservatism in postwar international thought", Review of International Studies, 2021.
Official website
Board of Directors
FBI files on the American Security Council on the Internet Archive

 
Non-profit organizations based in Washington, D.C.
United States foreign policy
Organizations established in 1958
1958 establishments in the United States